Helvella albella is a species of fungi in the family Helvellaceae that is found in Europe and North America. It was described by French mycologist Lucien Quélet in 1896.

References

External links

albella
Fungi described in 1896
Fungi of Europe
Fungi of North America